I Hate My Teenage Daughter is an American sitcom that ran on Fox from November 30, 2011 to March 20, 2012. It aired at the 9:30 pm (E/P)/8:30 pm (C) timeslot after The X Factor. The series stars Jaime Pressly and Katie Finneran. On May 10, 2012, Fox canceled the series. The six remaining episodes subsequently aired in Australia and New Zealand.

Synopsis
The series followed two mothers who fear their daughters are turning into the kind of girls who tormented them in high school. Annie Watson (Jaime Pressly), who grew up in a strict, conservative family, begins to notice that she has allowed her daughter Sophie (Kristi Lauren) to do whatever she wants; as a result, Sophie is a spoiled brat who frequently embarrasses and mocks her mother. Annie's best friend Nikki Miller (Katie Finneran), who grew up unpopular and overweight and has reinvented herself as a Southern Belle, begins to notice how manipulative her daughter Mackenzie (Aisha Dee) has become. Even the ex-husbands are not very good fathers: Annie's ex Matt is too clueless, prompting his lawyer brother Jack (Kevin Rahm) to step in (and become an object of Annie's crush) while Nikki's ex Gary is letting their complicated relationship become more complicated in the parenting department. These situations are among the major challenges Annie and Nikki must face to keep the daughters from turning into the people they were afraid of when they were their daughters' age.

Production and development
Fox announced on January 10, 2011, during the Television Critics Association press tour, that it had greenlighted the project from writers Sherry Bilsing and Ellen Kreamer after entertainment president Kevin Reilly noted that the network was not giving up on multi-camera comedy, and its first comedy pilot order would go to a traditional sitcom.

I Hate My Teenage Daughter was ordered to series status on May 10, 2011. On May 16, 2011, Fox announced that the series would air on Wednesday after The X Factor in the fall. The series premiered on Fox on Wednesday, November 30, 2011, at 9:30/8:30c.

Beginning March 6, Raising Hope started off Tuesday nights at 8/7c, followed by the return of I Hate My Teenage Daughter at 8:30/7:30c. New Girl stayed in its regular timeslot at 9/8c and Breaking In followed at 9:30/8:30c. On March 15, 2012, Fox announced it was pulling the show after its scheduled April 3 airing and would air the remaining four episodes during the summer. Fox had originally planned to finish off the show after 90-minute editions of American Idol beginning April 4, but then decided American Idol would continue in the two-hour format adopted when its eleventh season began on Wednesday nights on January 18, 2012. On March 21, Fox announced it was pulling the March 27 and April 3 airings and replacing the episodes with reruns of Raising Hope.

Fox had originally scheduled the remaining six episodes of the series to be burned off Sundays at 7 and 7:30. On May 1, however, Fox cancelled those plans. In January 2013, the unaired episodes began to air in international markets, with three episodes premiering on TV2 in New Zealand and another three on Nine in Australia.

Cast

Main
 Jaime Pressly as Annie Watson
 Katie Finneran as Nikki Miller
 Aisha Dee as Mackenzie Miller, Nikki's daughter
 Kristi Lauren as Sophie Gutierrez, Annie's daughter
 Eric Sheffer Stevens as Matt Gutierrez, Annie's ex-husband and Sophie's father
 Chad L. Coleman as Gary Miller, Nikki's ex-husband and Mackenzie's father
 Kevin Rahm as Jack Gutierrez, Matt's brother

Recurring
 Wendi McLendon-Covey as Deanna Dunbar, the principal at Mackenzie and Sophie's high school and former classmate of Nikki's.
 Mark Consuelos as Alejandro "Alex" Castillo, a Spanish-language professor at Annie and Nikki's community college.

Episodes

Reception
The premiere scored a 2.9 rating with adults 18–49, and 6.8 total million viewers. However, the second episode fell to a 2.1 rating among adults 18–49, and 5.38 million viewers. The third episode continued the decline, but the fourth bounced back, achieving the highest viewership since the premiere. The two-and-a-half-month break between the fourth and fifth episodes, however, did the series no favors; its ratings plummeted when it returned, leading to the decision by Fox to remove the show from the schedule. On Rotten Tomatoes, the series has an aggregate score of 10% based on 3 positive and 27 negative critic reviews. The website’s consensus reads: "I Hate My Teenage Daughter squanders its talented cast on unlikable, stereotypical characters and poor writing."

References

External links
 

2010s American sitcoms
2011 American television series debuts
2012 American television series endings
English-language television shows
Fox Broadcasting Company original programming
Television series by Warner Bros. Television Studios
Television shows set in Austin, Texas